Joseph Nolan may refer to:
 Joseph Nolan (politician), Irish nationalist politician
 Joseph Nolan (organist), English-born Australian organist and conductor. 
 Joseph A. Nolan, United States Army soldier and Medal of Honor recipient
 Joseph R. Nolan, American jurist
 Joe Nolan, American baseball player
 Joe Nolan (ice hockey), ice hockey player